Hypermusic may refer to:

 "Hyper Music" (song), by the English alternative rock band Muse from the 2001 album Origin of Symmetry
 Hypermusic Prologue: A Projective Opera in Seven Planes, an opera by Lisa Randall and Hèctor Parra

See also
 Hyperinstruments; see Tod Machover